The 1946 U.S. National Championships (now known as the US Open) was a tennis tournament that took place on the outdoor grass courts at the West Side Tennis Club, Forest Hills in New York City, United States. The tournament ran from 31 August until 8 September. It was the 66th staging of the U.S. National Championships, and the fourth Grand Slam tennis event of the year.

Finals

Men's singles

 Jack Kramer defeated  Tom Brown Jr.  9–7, 6–3, 6–0

Women's singles

 Pauline Betz defeated  Doris Hart  11–9, 6–3

Men's doubles
 Gardnar Mulloy /  Bill Talbert defeated  Frank Guernsey /  Don McNeill 3–6, 6–4, 2–6, 6–3, 20–18

Women's doubles
 Louise Brough /  Margaret Osborne defeated  Patricia Todd /  Mary Arnold Prentiss 6–1, 6–3

Mixed doubles
 Margaret Osborne /   Bill Talbert defeated  Louise Brough /  Robert Kimbrell 6–3, 6–4

References

External links
Official US Open website

 
U.S. National Championships
U.S. National Championships (tennis) by year
U.S. National Championships
U.S. National Championships
U.S. National Championships
U.S. National Championships